Aysha is a genus of anyphaenid sac spiders first described by Eugen von Keyserling in 1891. They are often called "sac spiders" because of the dwellings that they create for themselves to take shelter in. As is true with most other spiders, the pedipalps of the males are much larger than those of the females. They are found throughout South America up to Panama.

Species
 it contains forty-one species:
Aysha affinis (Blackwall, 1862) – Brazil
Aysha albovittata Mello-Leitão, 1944 – Brazil, Argentina
Aysha basilisca (Mello-Leitão, 1922) – Brazil
Aysha bonaldoi Brescovit, 1992 – Brazil
Aysha boraceia Brescovit, 1992 – Brazil
Aysha borgmeyeri (Mello-Leitão, 1926) – Brazil, Argentina
Aysha brevimana (C. L. Koch, 1839) – Brazil
Aysha caxambuensis (Mello-Leitão, 1926) – Brazil, Paraguay, Argentina
Aysha chicama Brescovit, 1992 – Brazil
Aysha clarovittata (Keyserling, 1891) – Brazil, Argentina
Aysha curumim Brescovit, 1992 – Brazil
Aysha diversicolor (Keyserling, 1891) – Brazil
Aysha ericae Brescovit, 1992 – Brazil, Argentina
Aysha fortis (Keyserling, 1891) – Brazil
Aysha guaiba Brescovit, 1992 – Brazil
Aysha guarapuava Brescovit, 1992 – Brazil
Aysha helvola (Keyserling, 1891) – Brazil
Aysha heraldica (Mello-Leitão, 1929) – Brazil
Aysha insulana Chickering, 1937 – Panama
Aysha janaita Brescovit, 1992 – Brazil
Aysha lagenifera (Mello-Leitão, 1944) – Argentina
Aysha lisei Brescovit, 1992 – Brazil
Aysha marinonii Brescovit, 1992 – Brazil, Paraguay, Argentina
Aysha montenegro Brescovit, 1992 – Brazil, Argentina
Aysha piassaguera Brescovit, 1992 – Brazil
Aysha pirassununga Brescovit, 1992 – Brazil, Argentina
Aysha proseni Mello-Leitão, 1944 – Brazil, Argentina
Aysha prospera Keyserling, 1891 – Bolivia, Brazil, Uruguay, Argentina
Aysha robusta (Keyserling, 1891) – Brazil
Aysha rubromaculata (Keyserling, 1891) – Brazil, Argentina
Aysha strandi (Caporiacco, 1947) – Guyana
Aysha striolata (Keyserling, 1891) – Brazil
Aysha subruba (Keyserling, 1891) – Brazil
Aysha taeniata (Keyserling, 1891) – Brazil
Aysha taim Brescovit, 1992 – Brazil
Aysha tapejara Brescovit, 1992 – Brazil
Aysha tertulia Brescovit, 1992 – Brazil, Argentina
Aysha triunfo Brescovit, 1992 – Brazil, Argentina
Aysha vacaria Brescovit, 1992 – Brazil
Aysha yacupoi Brescovit, 1992 – Brazil, Argentina
Aysha zenzesi (Mello-Leitão, 1945) – Brazil, Argentina

References 

Anyphaenidae
Spiders of Central America
Spiders of South America
Araneomorphae genera
Taxa named by Eugen von Keyserling